The Old Synagogue was a synagogue in the Berlin district of Marienviertel (present-day Mitte). Consecrated in 1714, it was known as the Great Synagogue until the opening of the New Synagogue, built in the 1860s to accommodate Berlin's expanding Jewish population. Nevertheless, services continued to be held in the Old Synagogue into the 20th century; it was restored in 1928. The synagogue survived Kristallnacht but was destroyed during World War II. It is marked with a plaque and part of the building's contours are marked with cobblestones.

References 

Ashkenazi Jewish culture in Berlin
Ashkenazi synagogues
Buildings and structures in Berlin destroyed during World War II
Synagogues in Berlin
Religious buildings and structures completed in 1714
1714 establishments in the Holy Roman Empire